Gun Hill is a 2014 American television film directed by Reggie Rock Bythewood and starring Larenz Tate. Produced in 2011, the film was delayed for almost three years until BET announced June 6, 2014, that Gun Hill will premiere on its network on July 2, 2014. The film was produced as a pilot for a possible new drama series on BET.

Synopsis
A pair of twins take different paths: one is an undercover agent and the other a cop. Trane is an agent with a secret task force. Bird is a recently freed convict who plays by a different set of rules. However, when Trane is murdered, Bird assumes his brother's identity, seeking his brother's murderer and a second chance at life while grappling with morality, fatherhood and love.

Cast
 Larenz Tate as Trane/Bird Stevens
 Emayatzy Corinealdi as Janelle Evans 
 Tawny Cypress as Andrea Logan
 Aisha Hinds as Arlene Carter
 Michael Aronov as Danny Raden
Phyllis Yvonne Stickney as Marva Stevens
Shanti Ashanti as Semi Faraj
 Hisham Tawfiq as Captain Sanford
Daniel Stewart Sherman as Mason
David J. Cork as Timms

References

External links
 Official website
 

African-American films
2010s English-language films
2014 television films
Television films as pilots
American television films